The Ministry of Communications and Information Technology (QATAR) (MCIT) is a Qatari ministry that was established within the new cabinet formation announced in June 2013 to be an extension of the Supreme Council of Information and Communication Technology that was established under Emiri Decree Law no. 36 of 2004.

The Ministry of Communications and Information Technology in Qatar is a government agency that is tasked with regulating and developing the communication and information technology sector within the country. The organization's responsibilities include setting policies and guidelines for the industry, as well as working to promote its growth and advancement. It plays a vital role in supporting the country's overall technological development.

Mandate 

The Ministry is specifically responsible for a wide-ranging mandate that includes: overseeing and developing the information and communications technology sector to make it more vibrant, advanced, and secure to support a diversified economy and benefit all the people of Qatar; introducing ICU plans, policies, programs, projects and initiatives to foster a competitive environment that is conducive to investments; developing the next generation of infrastructure and then securing and enhancing the efficiency of that infrastructure; and driving innovation well into the future as a change agent for human, social, economic and environmental progress. The Ministry also performs a critical and far-reaching role in developing e-government programs and boosting capacity and digital literacy to foster a technology-friendly environment that introduces innovative approaches to how we communicate, live and work.

Programs overview

The official portal of Qatar e-Government 
Qatar Government's official portal is https://hukoomi.gov.qa/. The role of the Qatar Official e-Government Portal, Hukoomi, is to make government information and services accessible to all citizens, residents, and visitors.

e-Government initiatives aim to increase the availability, accessibility, and effectiveness of e-services to citizens, residents and businesses; enable an integrated and efficient government through innovative use of ICT; and improve government transparency and stimulate participation in the democratic process.

To further improve the quality of Government services and make them more responsive to all categories of users, an improved version of “Hukoomi” was launched in 2019 in cooperation with government agencies and public service providers.

Digital Society 

The Ministry of Communications and Information Technology (MCIT QATAR) informs, inspires and supports all people in Qatar to gain the skills, knowledge and understanding they need to use ICT effectively and safely so that they can engage in the country's economic and cultural life and to support the development of a vibrant and capable ICT vocational and professional workforce in Qatar. MCIT is keen on enhancing ICT readiness and usage of all members of society and businesses so that everyone can participate in building Qatar's information-based economy.

Digital Society Key Programs:
 Digital Inclusion: The program targets segments of society that are at the risk of digital exclusion by creating opportunities for access, learning and effective use of technology.
 Digital Literacy: A program aiming to raise awareness and foster a healthy cyber culture in which all Qatar's population has the knowledge and critical understanding necessary to engage in safe online opportunities.
 ICT Skills: Aims at raising awareness and inspiring take-up of a wide array of possible ICT careers, in addition to developing a highly skilled and well-qualified ICT workforce to enrich Qatar's knowledge-based economy.
 Digital Impact and Emerging Technologies: Better known as the Rassed research program, this area of Digital Society focuses on studying the effects of ICT and the Internet on society, and enabling a better understanding of emerging digital technologies and their potential.

Cyber security 

Protecting Qatar's critical ICT infrastructure and systems is a top priority for the Ministry. To accomplish this, the Qatar Computer Emergency Response Team, Q-CERT was formed. Q-CERT works with government agencies, private and public sector organizations and Qatar's citizens to ensure that online threats are monitored and risks are contained. Q-CERT works to protect sensitive information and ensure safety on the Internet.

Since information security issues are not limited by national boundaries, Q-CERT is a member of FIRST, the global forum of incident response and security teams. FIRST fosters regional ties between security teams and partners around the world in order to share up-to-date information about threats and vulnerabilities.

National strategies 
The Ministry has launched three key national-level strategies that will accelerate Qatar's efforts towards becoming a secure, knowledge-based, accessible economy. The Qatar e-Government Strategy 2020 aims for better government services, lowered public spending and full coordination between government entities. The Qatar National Cyber Security Strategy, collaboratively developed by MCIT and the National Cyber Security Committee, represents a blueprint for moving forward to improve Qatar's cyber security toward a secure cyberspace to safeguard national interests and preserve the fundamental rights and values of the society. The Inclusion through Technology Strategy, developed for greater enablement of the people with disabilities through technology, will be implemented by the Qatar Assistive Technology Center (Mada).

References

External links 
 Ministry of Communications and Information Technology Official Website

2013 establishments in Qatar
Communications ministries
Ministries established in 2013
Government ministries of Qatar
Telecommunications in Qatar